Feeding Frenzy may refer to:

Basic meanings
Feeding frenzy, rapid feeding by predatory animals
Media feeding frenzy, intense journalistic attention

Films and TV
 Feeding Frenzy (2010 film), a genre-spoof movie by RedLetterMedia
 Feeding Frenzy: Jimmy Buffett Live!, 1990
Feeding Frenzy (TV series), a reality show
"Feeding Frenzy" (Magic City), a 2012 episode of the American television show Magic City
Feeding Frenzy (video game), a video game by PopCap Games

Books
 Feeding Frenzy, a book by Larry Sabato
 Feeding Frenzy, a novel in the Undercover Brothers series

Music

Albums
 Feeding Frenzy (album), an album by Darediablo

Songs
 "Feeding Frenzy", a song by  Midnight Oil  from their album Earth and Sun and Moon
 "Feeding Frenzy", a song from Tara Hugo Sings Philip Glass